The 2021–22 season is the 30th season in the existence of FC Baník Ostrava and the club's 10th consecutive season in the top flight of Czech football. In addition to the domestic league, FC Baník Ostrava are participating in this season's edition of the Czech Cup.

Players

First-team squad
.

Out on loan

Transfers

Pre-season and friendlies

Competitions

Overall record

Czech First League

League table

Results summary

Results by round

Matches

Czech Cup

References

FC Baník Ostrava seasons
Ostrava